Fusion IP plc was a UK based listed company that capitalised on intellectual property extracted from four UK based universities, three of which were part of the Russell Group of universities:
 University of Sheffield,
 Cardiff University,
 University of Nottingham,
 Swansea University.
It did this by creating companies around commercially opportunistic research and discoveries from the four universities. These companies were grown to eventually be sold (see spin-out companies).

Fusion IP was acquired by IP Group plc on 20 March 2014.

Fusion IP was one of a handful of companies that specialised in the commercialisation of university intellectual property within the UK through the sourcing of funding from public markets. The other two notable companies operating the same field were IP Group plc and Imperial Innovations plc. Additionally, smaller companies operated within the field of university intellectual property but did not have such a focus on spinning out companies, nor a formal contractual relationship with universities over intellectual property rights.

Incubation Model
Fusion IP's model of growing companies focused around a business incubation model in which Fusion IP employees initially ran, then continued to support the growth of every company within its portfolio.

Stages to the Fusion IP company creation and growth model:
 Review commercial opportunities produced by university partners, selecting those with the most potential for further development - "mining for ideas"
 Convert the idea into a small start up company - incubation stage
 Grow the company using a traditional venture capital approach
 Sell the company

Partnerships

University Partnerships
Fusion IP had current intellectual property agreements with four UK universities, three of which are part of the Russell Group of Universities. Fusion IP intends to further increase the number of university agreements it holds in the future.

University of Sheffield
In 2005, Fusion IP signed a 10-year agreement with the University of Sheffield for the exclusive rights to commercialise all of their university-owned medical intellectual property, through either licensing or the creation of spin-out companies.

In July 2008, Fusion IP signed a new expanded agreement with the University of Sheffield to add all university owned intellectual property from physical sciences to the original agreement, such that Fusion had the rights over all of the University of Sheffield's intellectual property, through either licensing or the creation of spin-out companies. This new expanded agreement gives Fusion IP the exclusive rights to all physical sciences intellectual property until 2018, in addition to the exclusive medical intellectual property rights, which currently runs to 2015.

Cardiff University
In 2007, Fusion IP signed a second exclusive 10-year agreement with Cardiff University to commercialise all of their intellectual property. This agreement was almost identical to that which the company entered into with Sheffield. This differed only through a limitation which requires Fusion IP to create a company around intellectual property in order to commercialise it.

University of Nottingham
Fusion IP partnered with the University of Nottingham in 2013. This was announced as part of a new £20m funding round. The agreement is less formal than the company's first two agreements, and in effect gives Fusion first “look-see” rights to IP generated at the university.

The agreement with the university was referred to as an MOU (memorandum of understanding).

Swansea University
Fusion IP partnered with Swansea University in 2013, at the same time as it entered an agreement with the University of Nottingham. The agreements for each university are identical.

Financing Partnerships

Finance Wales
The Finance Wales Group managed funds of more than £335 million and had invested more than £189 million. It entered a memorandum of understanding with Fusion IP during 2007 and renewed this agreement in 2013, at which time Swansea University was added to the terms of reference.

Finance Wales had co invested with Fusion IP in a number of companies including Diurnal, Medaphor, Q-Chip, Mesuro and Asalus.

IP Group

IP Group plc was a leading UK intellectual property commercialisation company, developing technology innovations primarily from its research intensive partner universities. IP Group provided more than traditional venture capital, providing its companies with access to business building expertise, networks, recruitment and business support.

Since its admission to AIM in 2003, the Group had raised approximately £85 million of net proceeds from its shareholders (most recently through a placing raising £53 million after expenses in June 2011). This had provided the Group with strong cash reserves from which to provide capital to its spin-out opportunities and portfolio companies as they develop.

Companies within the Fusion IP Portfolio (A-Z)
(As of 1 September 2013)

References

External links
 Fusion IP website

Cardiff University
Innovation in the United Kingdom
Technology companies of the United Kingdom
University of Nottingham